Serhiy Bashkyrov (born 11 March 1959) is a retired Soviet and Ukrainian football player and current coach.

Personal life

Native of the Volga Region Chuvashia, he has married one of a pair of twin sisters, together with another Ukrainian football coach Oleh Taran. His daughter Natalya is the wife of the Croatian international footballer Mladen Bartulović.

Honours

Player
Soviet Top League (all with Dnipro Dnipropetrovsk)
 Champion (1): 1988
 Runner-up, silver (1): 1987
 Runner-up, bronze (2): 1984, 1985

References

External links
 
 

1959 births
Living people
People from Chuvashia
Ukrainian footballers
Soviet footballers
Ukrainian football managers
Ukrainian expatriate footballers
Soviet Top League players
Ukrainian Premier League players
Rot-Weiß Oberhausen players
Expatriate footballers in Poland
Ukrainian expatriate sportspeople in Poland
Expatriate footballers in Germany
Ukrainian expatriate sportspeople in Germany
Ukrainian expatriate sportspeople in the Czech Republic
Ukrainian expatriate sportspeople in Slovakia
Pakhtakor Tashkent FK players
PFC Krylia Sovetov Samara players
FC Metalurh Zaporizhzhia players
FC Dnipro players
FC Spartak Moscow players
Association football midfielders
FC Iskra Smolensk players
Sportspeople from Chuvashia